Mengsheng Town is a rural town in Cangyuan Va Autonomous County, Yunnan, China.

History
Mengsheng Township was established in 1945 by Cangyuan Government. After the founding of the Communist State, Mengsheng District was set up in 1954. Its jurisdiction included today's Mengsheng Town, Nuoliang Township and Menglai Township. In 1968 it was renamed Mengsheng Commune and Jiuda Commune in the next year. It was upgraded to a town in 1988.

Administrative division
As of 2017, the town is divided into 8 villages: Mengsheng Village, Huizhu Village, Mankan Village, Mangyang Village, Yongrang Village, Xiabannai Village, Heping Village, and Nongke Village.

Geography
Mountains located adjacent to and visible from the townsite are: Mount Mankan and Mount Dayanzi.

The Lameng River, Hemeng River, Dangpa River, Xiaohei River and Nanbi River, tributaries of the Lancang River, flow through the town.

Economy
The town's main industries are agriculture and mining. The main cash crops are sugarcane, tea and oilseed rape.

Education
The town has 12 primary schools and 1 middle school.

Transportation
The Provincial Highway S314 passes across the town.

The town is connected to the Ruili-Menglian Expressway.

References

Divisions of Cangyuan Va Autonomous County